Carl Bosch (27 August 1874 – 26 April 1940) was a German chemist and engineer and Nobel Laureate in Chemistry. He was a pioneer in the field of high-pressure industrial chemistry and founder of IG Farben, at one point the world's largest chemical company.

Biography

Early years 
Carl Bosch was born in Cologne to a successful gas and plumbing supplier.  His father was Carl Friedrich Alexander Bosch (1843–1904) and his uncle was Robert Bosch, who pioneered the development of the spark plug and founded the multinational company Bosch. Carl, trying to decide between a career in metallurgy or chemistry, studied at the Königlich Technische Hochschule Charlottenburg (now the Technical University of Berlin) and the University of Leipzig from 1892 to 1898.

Career 

Carl Bosch attended the University of Leipzig, and this is where he studied under Johannes Wislicenus, and he obtained his doctorate in 1898 for research in organic chemistry. After he left in 1899 he took an entry-level job at BASF, then Germany's largest chemical and dye firm. From 1909 until 1913 he transformed Fritz Haber's tabletop demonstration of a method to fix nitrogen using high-pressure chemistry through the Haber–Bosch process to produce synthetic nitrate, a process that has countless industrial applications for making a near-infinite variety of industrial compounds, consumer goods, and commercial products. His primary contribution was to expand the scale of the process, enabling the industrial production of vast quantities of synthetic nitrate. To do this, he had to construct a plant and equipment that would function effectively under high gas pressures and high temperatures.  Bosch was also responsible for finding a more practical catalyst than the scarce osmium and expensive uranium being used by Haber.

There were many more obstacles as well, such as designing large compressors and safe high-pressure furnaces.  A means was needed to provide pure hydrogen gas in quantity as the feedstock. Also, cheap and safe means had to be developed to clean and process the product ammonia. The first full-scale Haber–Bosch plant was erected in Oppau, Germany, now part of Ludwigshafen.  With the process complete he was able to synthesize large amounts of ammonia, which was available for the industrial and agricultural fields. In fact, this production has increased the agricultural yields throughout the world. This work won him the Nobel prize for Chemistry in 1931.

After World War I Bosch extended high-pressure techniques to the production of synthetic fuel via the Bergius process and methanol. In 1925 Bosch helped found IG Farben, and was the first head of the company. From 1935, Bosch was chairman of the board of directors.

He received the Siemens-Ring in 1924 for his contributions to applied research and his support of basic research. In 1931 he was awarded the Nobel Prize in Chemistry together with Friedrich Bergius for the introduction of high pressure chemistry. Today the Haber–Bosch process produces 100 million tons of nitrogen fertilizer every year. After the Nazi seizure of power, Bosch was one of the industrialists selected for membership in Hans Frank's Academy for German Law in October 1933, where he served on the General Economic Council (Generalrat der Wirtschaft). In December 1933, Bosch received a contract to expand the production of synthetic oil, a development which was essential to Adolf Hitler's future war plans.

Personal life 

Bosch married Else Schilbach in 1902. Carl and Else had a son and a daughter together. A critic of many Nazi policies, including anti-Semitism, Bosch was gradually relieved of his high positions, and fell into depression and alcoholism. He died in Heidelberg.

Legacy 
The Haber–Bosch Process today consumes more than one percent of humanity's energy production and is responsible for feeding roughly one-third of its population. On average, one-half of the nitrogen in a human body comes from synthetically fixed sources, the product of a Haber–Bosch plant. Bosch was an ardent collector of insects, minerals, and gems. His collected meteorites and other mineral samples were loaned to Yale University, and eventually purchased by the Smithsonian.  He was an amateur astronomer with a well-equipped private observatory. The asteroid 7414 Bosch was named in his honour.

Carl Bosch along with Fritz Haber were voted the world's most influential chemical engineers of all time by members of the Institution of Chemical Engineers.

The Haber–Bosch process, quite possibly the best-known chemical process in the world, which captures nitrogen from the air and converts it to ammonia, has its hand in the process of the Green Revolution that has been feeding the increasing population of the world.

Bosch also won numerous awards including an honorary doctorate from Hochschule Karlsruhe (1918), the Liebig Memorial Medal of the Association of German Chemists along with the Bunsen Medal of the German Bunsen Society, the Siemens Ring, and the Golden Grashof Memorial medal of the VDI. In 1931 he was awarded the Nobel Prize for Chemistry for the contribution to the invention of chemical high pressure methods.  He also received the Exner medal from the Austrian Trade Association and the Carl Lueg Memorial Medal.  Bosch also enjoyed his membership of various German and foreign scientific academics, and his chairmanship of the Kaiser Wilhelm Society of which he became the President in 1937.

Awards and honours 
1931: Nobel Prize in Chemistry
1919: Liebig Medal of German Chemists Association
1924: Werner von Siemens Ring of Stiftung Werner-von-Siemens-Ring foundation
1932: Wilhelm Exner Medal of Austrian Trade Association
Bunsen Medal of the German Bunsen Society
Golden Grashof Memorial medal of the VDI
Carl Lueg Memorial Medal

See also 
German inventors and discoverers
Fritz Haber

References

Further reading 

Thomas Hager, The Alchemy of Air: A Jewish Genius, a Doomed Tycoon, and the Scientific Discovery That Fed the World but Fueled the Rise of Hitler (2008) .

External links 
 .
 Fritz Haber and Carl Bosch
 BASF Where Carl Worked
 BASF's Production
 
 

1874 births
1940 deaths
BASF people
Engineers from Cologne
German chemical engineers
German industrialists
German Nobel laureates
IG Farben people
Leipzig University alumni
Members of the Academy for German Law
Members of the Prussian Academy of Sciences
Nobel laureates in Chemistry
People from the Rhine Province
Scientists from Cologne
Technical University of Berlin alumni
Werner von Siemens Ring laureates
Organic chemists